Poko is a Canadian stop motion children's television series about a young boy, his pet dog, and his toy monkey. Produced in Canada by the Halifax Film Company, Poko was created by Jeff Rosen, and began production in 2003 and ended in 2006 after three production cycles. Poko is still broadcast in Canada on CBC Television in the Kids' CBC programming block, and was broadcast in Turkey on Yumurcak TV until the channel closed in mid-June 2016. It was narrated by actor and dancer Cory Bowles. In Brazil, it was narrated by the frontman of Capital Inicial, Dinho Ouro Preto.

The show was awarded the 2004 Gemini for Best Pre-school Program in 2004 and the Alliance for Children & Television (ACT) Grand Prize in 2007.

Characters

Main 
 Poko is a little boy who, every day, plays in his bedroom, or out in his backyard, but he also has a magic finger. When he says "Poko pippity pop!", he can draw objects, which then become real, by tracing them in the air with his finger. Poko often encounters obstacles and gets cranky or upset, but then cheers up with the help of an unseen narrator. Voiced by Cameron Davidson.
 Minus is Poko's pet dog. He is very playful, and often causes trouble. Minus is named for the sign minus (–); while not always understanding what's going on, he is sometimes showing much more human-like behaviour, such as being able to walk on his hind feet, play soccer, or dance. He is named for his ability to erase Poko's creations from existence (when they aren't needed anymore or he doesn't like them) by using his nose like an eraser. His silly antics often cause Poko to laugh and say "Silly Minus!"
 Mr. Murphy is Poko's stuffed toy monkey, who usually just sits around. He can sometimes be seen to have moved his hands (such as to shrug, or cover his eyes), but is never seen actually moving.

Recurring 
 Bibi is a young girl who is Poko's friend. She comes over sometimes to have a play date with Poko. Bibi can use her magic sticker book in a way that resembles Poko's ability, by opening the book to a sticker of an object and then making that object real, while saying "Bibi bibbity bop!". Bibi first appeared in the second season. Voiced by Jessica Parsons.

Show structure
The show follows the same sequence every episode:
 Title sequence
 Poko wakes up (longer version only in season 1)
 Indoor episode
 Play sequence
 Mighty Murph story (season 1); Poko's Playhouse (season 2)
 Play sequence
 Outdoors episode
 Play sequence
 Ending sequence

Episodes
Each episode features two segments. The first one is indoors, after Poko wakes up. The second is outdoors, in the garden. In both, Poko encounters a problem, but usually overcomes it after observing a smaller creature (such as a bird, ladybug, worm, etc.) solving a similar problem.

Also beneficial to children, the narrator helps Poko to name and understand his feelings, and find appropriate ways to deal with them: for example, on some occasions, when Poko has become angry at Minus, he has gone and given a blast on his tuba to release his frustration. Another common solution is for Poko to give Mr. Murphy a hug. In this way, the show suggests positive methods of dealing with problems. When this happens they usually perform the following: "hug a monkey...hug him tight...hug him till you feel alright". Poko does either that, or if Mr. Murphy isn't available, Poko releases his frustration by doing a dance called "The Poko Polka". He also has choices to release his frustration: either spending time alone on his swing, or shake his frustration out.

In the second season, a new segment was added called "Poko's Playhouse", in which Poko, Minus, and Bibi perform for a stuffed toy audience on a "Grand Ole Opry" type play-stage, with children performing a background song for each episode.

Similar to Toopy and Binoo, some episodes made appearances in more than one episode.

Season 1 (2003-2004)

Season 2 (2008)

Play sequence 
Two thirty-second shorts exist in each episode where Poko, Minus and Mr. Murphy play against a monocolor background. They may be swimming, surfing, riding an imaginary Roller coaster, or doing other activities or even dressing up like a ball.

Mighty Murph
In the middle of each show in season one, Poko reads a Mighty Murph story. Each one is made using Macromedia Flash, in cartoon style, and involves a baby Mr. Murphy in some dilemma, such as being hungry, or having nowhere to play. He then imagines he is Mighty Murph (a superhero who is parodied as Superman as Mighty Murph can be seen doing a scene which is a reference to the Superman (Fielscheir animated series), and flies around to find a solution to his problem. His search is fruitless, and he realizes the best place is just where he is, as his own self with his mother. The stories are told by the narrator.

Awards
 Gemini - Best Pre-School Program (2004)
 ACT Award - Grand Prize (2007)
 ACT Award - Animation Age 3-5 (2007)

References

External links

 https://web.archive.org/web/20140426221553/http://www.canadaonscreen.ca/productions/television/poko
 
 Poko Pippity Pop - Kids' CBC Web Game
 Poko on Kids' CBC - for parents
 POKO on Halifax Film's website

2000s Canadian animated television series
2003 Canadian television series debuts
2008 Canadian television series endings
Animated television series about children
Animated television series about dogs
Animated television series about monkeys
Canadian children's animated comedy television series
Canadian preschool education television series
Canadian stop-motion animated television series
CBC Television original programming
Television series by DHX Media
Animated preschool education television series
2000s preschool education television series
Television shows set in Nova Scotia 
Television shows filmed in Halifax, Nova Scotia 
Canadian Screen Award-winning television shows
English-language television shows